Robert Cogoi (born Mirko Kogoj, 25 October 1939 – 14 May 2022) was a Belgian singer, best known for his participation in the 1964 Eurovision Song Contest.

Early career
Cogoi was born in Châtelet to Slovene parents. In 1961 he picked up a contract with Philips Records, and the following year, won first prize at the Grand Prix International des Variétés at the Casino in Ostend with the song "Si un jour", which went on to sell 100,000 copies in France, earning Cogoi a gold disc.

Eurovision Song Contest
In 1964, Cogoi was chosen as the Belgian representative to perform his self-penned song "Près de ma rivière" ("Close by My River") in the ninth Eurovision Song Contest, which took place on 21 March in Copenhagen. For the first time since the inaugural contest in 1956, the Belgian entry was chosen by internal selection on the part of TV channel RTBF rather than by a public or jury vote. "Près de ma rivière" received only two votes (from Monaco and Portugal), which was enough for a joint tenth-place finish of 16 entries, as four other songs received no votes at all.

Later career
Cogoi continued releasing albums and singles, with modest success, until the late 1960s. In 1976 he appeared in the Belgium film Les arpents dorés.

After many years out of the public eye, Cogoi made a guest appearance, along with several other former Eurovision participants, at the Belgian Eurovision national final in 2005.

Discography

Singles 

Si un jour (1962)
Pardonnez-moi Seigneur (1962)
Je m'sens très seul (1963)
Tu mens, mon amour (1963)
Je fais serment (1963)
Dou, dou, dou, doux (1963)
Quand le soleil dit bonjour aux montagnes (1964)
Près de ma rivière (1964, außerhalb Kanadas nur als EP veröffentlicht)
Quand le jour se lève (1964, nur in Kanada)
Quand (1964, nur in Kanada)
Pas une place pour me garer (1966)
J'avais besoin de parler à quelqu'un (1966)
La télé (1966)
Pas une place pour me garer (1966, nur in Kanada)
Pour le meilleur et pour le pire (1967)
Je te demande pardon (1967)
L'église (1967, nur in Kanada)
El bandido (1967, nur in Kanada)
Gina (1968)
Mon île aux cocotiers (1968)
Au four et au moulin (1969)
Ma richesse (1969)
"La Station Service"/"Le Monde Est Grand " ("Hej Gamle Man") (1971)

EP`s 

Si un jour (1962)
Je m'sens très seul (1963)
Je serais mieux chez moi (1963)
Dou, dou, dou, doux (1963)
Près de ma rivière (1964)
Non, rien n'a changé (1964)
Quand le soleil dit bonjour aux montagnes (1964)
Attendez, attendez (1965)
Ça se voit sur ton visage (1965)
8h, 11h10’, 15h23’ (1966)
J'avais besoin de parler à quelqu'un (1966)
La télé (1966)
Monica (1967)
Je te demande pardon (1967)

Albums 

Je serais mieux chez moi... (1963)
Personne... (1964)
Les grands succès de Robert Cogoi (1964)
Je m'sens très seul (1964)
Robert Cogoi (1967)

References

External links
 
 

1939 births
2022 deaths
People from Châtelet
Belgian male singers
Eurovision Song Contest entrants for Belgium
Eurovision Song Contest entrants of 1964
Belgian people of Yugoslav descent